Jordán Reservoir is a reservoir inside the town of Tábor in the South Bohemian Region of the Czech Republic. Built in 1492, it is the oldest dam in the Central Europe.

History and parametres
The reservoir was created by creating an earth dam across the Tismenický brook with the purpose of providing drinking water for the town's inhabitants. Later, it was used for aquaculture. Today it is used as a place of recreation. It contains around 3 million m3 of water.

Jordánský brook flows out from the reservoir, with the 18-metre high Jordánský waterfall just after the levee. A short distance upstream on Košínský brook, next to the village of Náchod, lies a smaller dam named Malý Jordán ("Small Jordán").

In 1991 a road bridge was built over the reservoir. The bridge is suspended on a single 77-metre high pylon. The length of the bridge is 208.5 m, and it runs 10.5 m above the water surface.

Recreation
The northern bank of Jordán is called Plovka and it is often used in summer for sunbathing. There is also a beach which is used in summer for swimming and a restaurant. It is also possible to lend paddle boats and normal boats there. Near the east part of Jordán is a traffic park. There is also a children's playground including a sandbox and climbing frame. On the south side, there are many pontoons.

Setting
Jordán is located in the east part of Tábor, next to the main square.

Fauna
In Jordán the greatest fish that has ever been documented was a carp weighing , found dead on the shore.

References

External links
Short overview (in Czech)
Short information about the bridge (in Czech)

Tábor
Geography of the South Bohemian Region
Lakes of the Czech Republic